Forgotten Roads (Spanish: La Nave del Olvido) is a 2020 Chilean romantic drama film written and directed by Nicol Ruiz Benavides in her directorial debut. Starring Rosa Ramírez Ríos and Romana Satt.

Synopsis 
After the death of her husband, 70-year-old Claudina has to start over and she moves in with her daughter and grandson. She has a strained relationship with her daughter, but she is very fond of her grandchild. Before long, she meets and instantly falls in love with her neighbour Elsa.

Cast 
The actors participating in this film are:

 Rosa Ramírez como Claudina
 Romana Satt como Elsa
 Gabriela Arancibia como Alejandra
 Claudia Devia como Ignacia
 Raúl López Leyton como Facundo/Ambrosia
 Cristóbal Ruiz como Cristóbal
 María Carrillo como Marcela
 María José Benavides as Marina
 Hugo Chamorro como Eugenio
 Gunther Butter as Marcela's Husband

Production 
In 2016, filming began in the town of Lautaro, Ninth Region, with a duration of 16 days for its completion.

Release 
Forgotten Roads premiered in the US at the San Francisco International LGBT Film Festival on September 17, 2020. and in August 2021 at the Santiago SANFIC International Film Festival in Chile. It premiered on January 13, 2022 in Peruvian theaters.

Awards

References

External links 

 

2020 films
2020 romantic drama films
2020 LGBT-related films
Chilean romantic drama films
Chilean LGBT-related films
Films set in Chile
2020s Spanish-language films
Films shot in Chile
Films about old age
2020 directorial debut films
2020s Chilean films